The Alverson-Copeland House is a historic house located at 1612 Rochester Street in Lima, Livingston County, New York.

Description and history 
It was built in about 1853, and is a two-story, three-bay-wide and three-bay-deep, brick residence with late Greek Revival and early-Italianate-style design and decoration features. A -story brick wing extends from the rear. The house features a one-story, flat-roofed verandah on the front with broadly projecting eaves, full molded entablature, and Egyptian/Moorish Revival inspired support posts.

It was listed on the National Register of Historic Places on August 31, 1989.

References

Houses on the National Register of Historic Places in New York (state)
Italianate architecture in New York (state)
Greek Revival houses in New York (state)
Moorish Revival architecture in New York (state)
Houses completed in 1853
Houses in Livingston County, New York
National Register of Historic Places in Livingston County, New York